Gregory Anatole Wilcock is a career officer with the Department of Foreign Affairs and Trade.

High Commissioners of Australia to Bangladesh
Australian National University alumni
Living people
Year of birth missing (living people)